Roger Roche was a French political activist in Senegal. In 1925 he, along with two other persons, founded a cell of the French Communist Party in Rufisque. This was the first communist organisation in Senegal.

Later Roche left the party and joined the SFIO.

Year of birth missing
Year of death missing
People of French West Africa
Senegalese communists
French Section of the Workers' International politicians